Marie-Thérèse Humbert (born July 17, 1940) is a Mauritian writer. She is a recipient of the Grand prix des lectrices de Elle.

Biography
She was born in Quatre Bornes and was educated at Cambridge University and the Sorbonne. She moved to France in 1968. She ran as a socialist candidate in the Indre department of France and also ran as a candidate for municipal government in Saint-Julien-de-Vouvantes.

Selected works

Novels 
 À l'autre bout de moi (1979), received the Grand prix des lectrices de Elle.
 Le Volkameria (1984)
 Une robe d'écume et de vent (1989)
 Un fils d'orage (1992), received the Prix Terre de France
 La montagne des signaux (1994)
 Le chant du seringat la nuit (1997)
 Amy (1998)
 Comme un voile d'ombres (2000)

Short Stories 
 "En guise de préface" in Maurice, le tour de l'île en quatre-vingts lieux (1994)
 "Parole de femme" in Au tour des femmes (1995)
 "De la lumière, de l'amour et du silence", "Le tout ainsi, en vrac" and "Clopin-clopant" in Raymonde Vincent, 1908-1985, hommages (1995)
 "Adeline" in Tombeau du cœur de François II (1997)
 "La véritable histoire de notre mère Eve au Jardin d'Eden" in Elles, Histoires de femmes (1999)
 "Les galants de Lydie" in Une enfance outremer (2001)
 "Fraternité ; hommage au poète Édouard Maunick" in Riveneuve Continents, Winter 2009-2010

References 

1940 births
Living people
Mauritian novelists
Mauritian women writers
Mauritian women novelists
Mauritian women short story writers
Alumni of the University of Cambridge
University of Paris alumni
20th-century Mauritian writers
21st-century Mauritian writers
20th-century women writers
21st-century women writers